J. Ernest Bell II (born April 26, 1941) is an American politician and lawyer. He served in the Maryland House of Delegates from 1983 to 1994, representing District 29B.

Early life
J. Ernest Bell II was born on April 26, 1941, in Leonardtown, Maryland. He graduated from St. Mary's Ryken High School in 1959. Bell graduated from Mount St. Mary's University with a Bachelor of Science in 1963. He graduated from the Columbus School of Law in Catholic University of America with a J.D. in 1966. He was admitted to the bar in Maryland in 1970.

Career
Bell served as a captain in the U.S. Marine Corps from 1966 to 1970. He received a Navy Achievement Medal. He then worked as an attorney.

Bell served as a member of the Maryland House of Delegates, representing District 29B and St. Mary's County, Maryland from 1983 to 1994. He was a Democrat.

Personal life
Bell is married and has four children.

References

Living people
1941 births
People from Leonardtown, Maryland
Mount St. Mary's University alumni
Columbus School of Law alumni
Democratic Party members of the Maryland House of Delegates
United States Marines